The Cirrus SR22 is a single-engine four- or five-seat composite aircraft built from 2001 by Cirrus Aircraft of Duluth, Minnesota.

It is a development of the Cirrus SR20, with a larger wing, higher fuel capacity, and a more powerful, 310-horsepower (231 kW) engine.

The SR22 series has been the world's best-selling general aviation (GA) airplane every year since 2003. With 6,149 units delivered from 2001–19, and in combination with the SR20, a total of 7,645, it is the most-produced GA aircraft of the 21st century, and is the single most-produced GA aircraft made from composite material, accounting for over 30% of the entire piston aircraft market.

The Cirrus SR22 is equipped with a whole-plane emergency recovery parachute system: the Cirrus Airframe Parachute System (CAPS). This has contributed to its market success and has given it the nickname "the plane with the parachute".

Design and development

The SR22, certified in November 2000, is a more powerful version of the earlier SR20. Production of the aircraft started in 2001. The SR22 is a low-wing cantilever monoplane of composite construction, featuring fixed (non-retractable) tricycle landing gear with a castering nose wheel and steering via differential braking on the main wheels. It is powered by a nose-mounted 310 hp (231 kW) Continental IO-550-N  piston engine. The four-seat cabin is accessed through doors on both sides of the fuselage.

The SR-series remains the only production airplane in its class to include side stick flight controls that combine aspects of a traditional yoke handle (referred to in the industry as a "side yoke").

The Cirrus SR22, like the SR20, is equipped with the Cirrus Airframe Parachute System (CAPS), which can lower the entire aircraft to the ground relatively gently in an emergency.

In 2004, the company introduced the SR22 G2 (Generation 2) and in 2007 the SR22 G3 (Generation 3). Both were defined by airframe modifications, G2 by fuselage and G3 by modified wing and landing gear.

In a 2012 Flying magazine review, then editor-in-chief Robert Goyer wrote that the Cirrus SR22 "is the most sophisticated single-engine civilian airplane ever built and by a long shot."

In 2013, the manufacturer introduced the SR22 G5 (Generation 5) (there was no G4). The G5 received only minor changes for 2014, including integrated LED lighting and Beringer brakes.

In 2014, the SR22 and SR22T had been the best-selling four- to five-seat fixed-wing aircraft in the world for 12 years in a row.

In 2016, Cirrus introduced improvements to the SR Series, including Bluetooth wireless connectivity, remote keyless entry, a convenience lighting system, and an easy-access door latch.

In 2017, the company introduced the SR22 G6 (Generation 6), with several major upgrades to the avionics and new navigation lighting.

In September 2019, Cirrus unveiled the TRAC, a training-oriented version of the SR-series with a simplified interior, more durable seat material, backseat radio transmit switch to allow an observer to communicate with air traffic control, integrated engine indication and crew alerting/warning systems, and simulated retractable landing gear controls and position lights to allow cadets and instructors to feign landing gear operation and failures during instructional flights (the actual landing gear remains permanently fixed).

In January 2020, the company introduced a new mobile app for the SR Series, called "Cirrus IQ", which enables remote aircraft communication including access to pre-flight status information like fuel and oxygen levels, battery voltage, oil temperature, aircraft location and flight hours.

In October 2020, it was revealed that a 2003 SR22 would be displayed in the new general aviation exhibition "We All Fly" in the Smithsonian Institution's National Air and Space Museum, which opened in 2022.

In January 2022, Cirrus announced speed and aesthetic improvements to the G6 SR-series, with a  increased cruise speed, upgrades to the mobile IQ app, USB-A and USB-C charging ports and more.

Turbocharged models
Cirrus introduced the SR22 Turbo in 2006, with a Tornado Alley turbonormalizing upgrade kit that is factory installed under a Supplemental Type Certificate. It included twin turbonormalizers and twin intercoolers. The conversion includes built-in oxygen and a Hartzell three-blade (later four-blade as optional) lightweight composite propeller. The weight of the conversion reduces the SR22's useful load. Air conditioning is available with the SR22 Turbo, but this further reduces the useful load.

In 2010, Cirrus introduced the SR22T. This used a new engine, the Continental TSIO-550K, which produces  with a 7.5:1 compression ratio and can run on 94 octane fuel.

Glass cockpit

SR22s and SR20s built before 2003 were equipped with traditional analog instruments and a 10" (later 12") Multi-function display (MFD). In February 2003, Cirrus began offering SR22s with the Avidyne Entegra primary flight display (PFD), making the plane the first of its kind to come with a glass cockpit. Later that year, this instrumentation became standard equipment on all SR-series aircraft and sparked a major transition in general aviation, whereby over 90% of all new light aircraft by the year 2006 were equipped with glass cockpits. Retrofits are available for the older SR aircraft that replace the analog instrument panels with one that includes a PFD, a new MFD and the installation of back-up mechanical instruments.

On 22 May 2008, Cirrus revealed the "Cirrus Perspective" glass cockpit (by Garmin).  Both cockpits were available for a while (the Avidyne cockpit was initially standard equipment) and after 2008 the SR22 was sold with only the Perspective panel.

In 2009, the third-generation Cirrus SR22 GTS came equipped with a new enhanced vision system (EVS), a sophisticated dual-wavelength instrument that offers both infrared and synthetic vision.

At the 2010 EAA AirVenture, Cirrus announced its plans to certify Garmin's ESP system (Electronic Stability and Protection) on the Cirrus SR22. It included advanced flight envelope protection that could stabilize the aircraft with the push of a button, to avoid spiral from developing.

The Cirrus Perspective-Plus avionics flight deck was introduced in 2017, with a faster processing speed, animated datalink weather, payload management, visual approach capabilities, wireless database uploads, glass back-up instruments, and more.

In 2020, the Perspective-Plus flight deck included a new stabilized approach advisory system which provides alerts to the pilot of unstable conditions during approach.

Flight into known icing
Cirrus completed testing for flight into known icing conditions (FIKI) on 12 January 2009. The equipment change involved installing a larger fluid tank for the TKS Ice Protection System and protecting more areas of the aircraft. The FAA approved the new installation in April 2009.

Operational history

For several years, the largest fleet of Cirrus SR22s was operated by ImagineAir, which was in operation from 2007–2018. Previously to this, the largest fleet had been operated by SATSair with 26 aircraft. It began operations in 2004 and went out of business in 2009. The largest European operator is Fly Aeolus, a Belgian fractional ownership company established in 2009 that operates 13 SR22s. In May 2022, California-based air taxi company Joby Aviation received Part 135 air service certification from the FAA to operate a fleet of SR22s, pending certification of its eVTOL aircraft.

Australian pilot Ryan Campbell used an SR22 to become the youngest pilot to fly solo around the world (a title which he held for nearly a year), at age nineteen. He completed his trip on 7 September 2013 in Wollongong. His SR22, Spirit of the Sapphire Coast, was modified by removing three seats and adding a  fuselage tank for a total of  usable.

The French Air and Space Force uses six SR22s as training aircraft, and the Royal Saudi Air Force acquired 25 SR22s in 2013, replacing Cessna 172s as primary trainers at the King Faisal Air Academy. In 2015 Emirates purchased 22 aircraft for training purposes. The Minnesota State Patrol uses a special missions "Cirrus Perception" SR22 for law enforcement operations, surveillance, search and rescue missions and more.

As of September 2018, the SR-series has deployed the parachute system 79 times carrying 163 survivors.

Safety record
Between 2001 and May 2014, 147 US-registered Cirrus SR22 aircraft crashed, resulting in 122 fatalities.

In 2011, the accident record of the SR20/SR22 was examined by Aviation Consumer magazine. It found that the series' overall accident record is better than average for light aircraft, exceeded only by the Diamond DA40 and DA42. However its fatal accident rate is worse, at 1.6 per 100,000 flight hours—which places it higher than the United States general aviation rate of 1.2, and higher than the Diamond DA40 (0.35), Cessna 172 (0.45), Diamond DA42 (0.54), Cessna 182 (0.69), and the Cessna 400 (1.0), despite the SR22's full aircraft parachute system.

By the end of 2013, the accident rate had been reduced to a fatality rate of 1.01 per 100,000 flight hours. This was attributed to better training, particularly in use of the ballistic parachute system.

The accident rate continued to decrease in 2014, with a fatal rate of .42 per 100,000 flight hours, one of the industry's lowest. This marked the fewest fatalities in a single year for Cirrus since 2001, and the first year where the number of CAPS deployments (12) exceeded the number of fatal accidents (3).

Variants

SR22
Original version
SR22 G2
Improved variant
SR22 Turbo G2
In July 2006, Cirrus announced a turbo normalized SR22. Some initial limited models were identified as Signature Edition SE22 G2s—equipped with additional features including an unequally painted exterior, black leather seats, and the signatures of Cirrus founders Dale and Alan Klapmeier on the cowling.
SR22TN
Version with a Tornado Alley turbo-normalizing kit added to the Continental IO-550-N engine producing .
SR22 G3
Upgraded models, such as the GTS, come with airbag seatbelts.

SR22T
Introduced in June 2010, with a turbocharged Continental TSIO-550-K producing . The engine has low-compression pistons, producing a 7.5 to 1 compression ratio to allow the engine to run on lower octane fuel, 94UL.
SR22/22T G5
On 17 January 2013, Cirrus Aircraft announced the fourth generation of the SR22 and SR22T (skipping G4 as a designation for the new version of the aircraft). Features included a  increase in the maximum takeoff weight, and some previous options—60/40 split back seat, ADS-B transponder, and Garmin GFC700 autopilot—became standard equipment. The wheel pants were redesigned and included an access door for the inflator valve. Cirrus improved the aircraft's ballistic parachute using a larger canopy to account for the higher takeoff weight, and a more powerful rocket. The rocket firing changed to a fail-safe electronic ignition, with a maximum operating speed of 140 knots (up from 133 knots). Earlier versions used a pyrotechnic rocket ignition system. Maximum flap speeds were increased to 150 knots (first notch); 110 knots (second notch); and added another 3.5 degrees of extension. Fuel burn slightly increased at cruise speeds, rate of climb was reduced, liftoff speed increased to 80 knots (from 72 knots), and stall speed increased to 60 knots (from 58 knots).
SR22/22T G6
Introduced in January 2017, the G6 model adds new LED wingtip lights and an updated Garmin avionics flight deck (known as "Cirrus Perspective-Plus") with a 10-times faster instrument processing speed and several other upgrades.
TRAC
Introduced in September 2019, the TRAC is a flight-training version SR22/22T with a simplified, more durable interior, Perspective+ flight deck, rear seat push-to-talk functionality, and simulated landing gear controls.

Operators

Civil
The aircraft is used by flying schools, several air charter and small air taxi carriers, as well as private individuals and companies.

Military and government

Chilean Air Force – 8

French Air and Space Force – 6

Royal Saudi Air Force – 25

Emirates Flight Training Academy – 22

Minnesota State Patrol – 1

Accidents and incidents
SR22s have been involved in numerous accidents and incidents, with some of the most notable being:
 On November 3, 2015, former Walmart CEO William S. Simon deployed CAPS in his SR22 over Fayetteville near the University of Arkansas when the plane experienced engine trouble. A vehicle struck the aircraft on a busy road after it had touched down. All parties involved suffered only minor injuries.
 On May 12, 2021, a Swearingen Metroliner SA226-TC and an SR22 collided on approach to Centennial Airport near Denver, Colorado. The Cirrus pilot deployed CAPS and made a safe off-airport parachute-assisted landing; the Metroliner pilot landed safely at Centennial with damage to the cabin and empennage, and a failed engine. No injuries were reported.

Specifications (SR22-G5)

See also

References

Notes

External links 

 
 

SR22
2000s United States civil utility aircraft
Single-engined tractor aircraft
Low-wing aircraft